Phorinia is a genus of flies in the family Tachinidae.

Species
 Phorinia aurifrons Robineau-Desvoidy, 1830
 Phorinia bifurcata Tachi & Shima, 2006
 Phorinia breviata Tachi & Shima, 2006
 Phorinia convexa Tachi & Shima, 2006
 Phorinia denticulata Tachi & Shima, 2006
 Phorinia flava Tachi & Shima, 2006
 Phorinia minuta Tachi & Shima, 2006
 Phorinia pruinovitta Chao & Liu, 1986
 Phorinia spinulosa Tachi & Shima, 2006

References

Tachinidae